Acleros nigrapex, the powdered dusky skipper, is a butterfly in the  family Hesperiidae. It is found in Liberia, Ivory Coast, Ghana, Nigeria, Cameroon, the Central African Republic, the Democratic Republic of the Congo, Uganda and north-western Tanzania. The habitat consists of forests.

References

Butterflies described in 1937
Erionotini